Morro and Jasp are a Canadian clown duo created by Heather Marie Annis, Byron Laviolette and Amy Lee. Based in Toronto, Canada, they produce live theatre productions, web videos, cook books and video games under the banner of U.N.I.T. Productions.

Awards 
2012Dora Mavor Moore Award for "Outstanding Performance" in the Independent theatre category
2014Canadian Comedy Award for "Best Variety Act"
2016Gourmand Cookbook Award for "Most Innovative Cookbook"

References 

 http://www.stage-door.com/Theatre/2015/Entries/2015/7/1_Morro_and_Jasp_Do_Puberty.html
 http://www.stage-door.com/Theatre/2015/Entries/2015/5/15_Morro_and_Jasp__9-5.html
 https://nowtoronto.com/stage/fringe-review-morro-and-jasp-do-puberty/
 http://www.twisitheatreblog.com/archives/2536
 http://torontoist.com/2015/07/torontoist-hits-the-fringe/
 http://www.vueweekly.com/best_of_the_fringe/
 https://edinburghfestival.list.co.uk/article/74197-morro-and-jasp-do-puberty/
 http://www.broadwaybaby.com/shows/morro-and-jasp-do-puberty/706684
 https://www.theglobeandmail.com/arts/theatre-and-performance/theatre-reviews/morro-and-jasp-9-5-clown-sisters-are-invariably-sentimental/article24457562/
 https://www.thestar.com/entertainment/stage/2015/05/16/clown-duo-morro-and-jasp-take-on-the-working-world.html
 https://nowtoronto.com/stage/review%3A-morro-and-jasp%3A-9-5/
 https://nowtoronto.com/stage/theatre/of-mice-and-morro-and-jasp/
 https://www.theglobeandmail.com/arts/theatre-and-performance/torontos-top-10-theatre-productions-in-2014/article22071247/
 http://www.cbc.ca/manitoba/scene/theatre/2012/07/26/fringe-the-cbc-review-crews-favourite-show-of-fringe-12/

External links 

Canadian clowns
Canadian Comedy Award winners
Canadian comedy duos